Legend  is the eighth studio album by American singer John Legend. It was released on September 9, 2022, through John Legend Inc. and Republic Records.

Critical reception

Legend was polarized response upon release, AllMusic editor Andy Kellman called Legend "a set distinguishable from the rest of his catalog mainly for its length and crowd of collaborators." He found that "Legend is at his best when entertainment isn't his objective." Rolling Stone critic David Browne remarked that "Legend lets loose on the first half and shows tasteful restraint on the other."

Track listing

Notes
  signifies a primary and vocal producer
  signifies a co-producer
  signifies an additional producer
  signifies a vocal producer

Personnel

Volume 1
Musicians

 John Legend – vocals (all tracks), keyboards (tracks 2, 11), piano (6, 8, 12)
 Ayana George – background vocals (1–6, 8, 10, 12)
 Natalie Imani – background vocals (1–6, 8–10, 12)
 SheNice Johnson – background vocals (1–6, 8, 10, 12)
 Ian Hendrickson-Smith – baritone saxophone (1, 2, 4, 5, 10, 11)
 Scott Mayo – flute, tenor saxophone (1); baritone saxophone, tenor saxophone (8, 9)
 Andrew DeRoberts – guitar, keyboards (1, 2, 5, 6, 12); bass guitar, drums (1, 2, 6, 12); additional vocals (1, 2), programming (2), percussion (5), drum programming (6)
 Erick Walls – guitar (1, 3, 9), keyboards (1)
 Neal Sugarman – tenor saxophone (1, 4, 5, 10, 11)
 Lemar Guillary – trombone (1, 8, 9)
 Dave Guy – trumpet (1, 2, 4, 5, 10, 11); baritone saxophone, flute (1)
 Brandyn Phillips – trumpet (1, 8, 9)
 Drew Love – additional vocals (1)
 Lemar Carter – drums (1)
 Rogét Chahayed – keyboards (1)
 Ryan Tedder – additional vocals (2, 3, 5, 6, 12), keyboards (2, 6, 12), programming (2, 5), drum programming (3, 6, 12), guitar (3, 12), percussion (3)
 Cochemea Gastelum – baritone saxophone (2)
 Eren Cannata – guitar (2)
 Harv – keyboards, programming (2)
 Charlie Puth – additional vocals, keyboards (3)
 Ian Kirkpatrick – bass guitar, drum programming, keyboards, percussion, programming (3)
 José Ríos – guitar (4)
 Hakeem Holloway – bass guitar (4)
 Kelsey Gonzalez – bass guitar (4)
 AJ Fanning – cello (4)
 Adrienne Woods – cello (4)
 Caleb Jones – cello (4)
 Julie Jung Yoo – cello (4)
 Michelle E. Rearick – cello (4)
 Ro Rowan – cello (4)
 Matt Merisola – drums (4)
 Matthew Jones – string arrangement (4)
 Drew Forde – viola (4)
 Karoline Menezes – viola (4)
 Richard Adkins – viola (4)
 Rita Andrade – viola (4)
 Stefan Smith – viola (4)
 Wilfred Farquharson – viola (4)
 Chris Woods – violin (4)
 Hannah White – violin (4)
 Jake Falby – violin (4)
 Jennifer Floyd – violin (4)
 Kayvon Sesar – violin (4)
 Lesa Terry – violin (4)
 Maxwell Karmazyn – violin (4)
 Nadira Scruggs – violin (4)
 Paul Cartwright – violin (4)
 Shigeru Logan – violin (4)
 Stephanie Matthews – violin (4)
 Stephanie Yu – violin (4)
 Susan Chatman – violin (4)
 T.Nava – Wurlitzer electronic piano (4)
 Karyn Porter – background vocals (5, 9)
 Bosco Mann – bass guitar (5, 11)
 Brian Wolfe – drums (5, 10)
 Fernando Velez – percussion (5, 10)
 Victor Axelrod – Rhodes (5), Wurlitzer electronic piano (10)
 The Monsters & Strangerz – drum programming, keyboards (6, 12)
 Zach Skelton – drum programming, keyboards (6, 12); guitar (12)
 Michael Pollack – keyboards (6)
 Akeel Henry – additional vocals, keyboards, programming (7)
 Anthony M. Jones – drums, keyboards, programming (7, 11); bass guitar (7)
 Kevin Ekofo – guitar (7)
 Andrew Kingslow – piano (7), glockenspiel (8)
 Oak – bass guitar, keyboards, programming (8)
 Keith "Ten4" Sorrells – drum programming (8)
 Alex Nice – keyboards, programming (8)
 Jaramye Daniels – additional vocals (9)
 Munyungo Jackson – percussion (9)
 David Bowden – bass guitar, drums (10)
 Dante Bowden – drums, keyboards, programming (10)
 Larissa Maestro – cello (11)
 Nicole Neely – string arrangement, viola (11)
 Shedrick Mitchell – string arrangement (11)
 Alicia Enstrom – violin (11)
 Kristin Weber – violin (11)

Technical

 Dave Kutch – mastering
 Serban Ghenea – mixing
 Tim McClain – engineering
 Rich Rich – engineering (1–3, 5, 6, 12)
 David Anthony – engineering (1)
 Neal Shaw – engineering (1, 4, 5, 11)
 Matt Merisola – engineering (4)
 Brian Warfield – engineering (7)
 Gregg Rominiecki – engineering (7)
 Rafae Fai Bautista – engineering, vocal mixing (7)
 Ricky P – engineering (7)
 Joe Gallagher – engineering (10)
 Joshua Keith – engineering (11)
 Johnscott Sanford – engineering, additional mixing (12)
 Kevin Peterson – mastering assistance
 Bryan Bordone – mixing assistance
 Alisse Laymac – engineering assistance (1, 4–9, 11)
 Peter Hanaman – engineering assistance (1, 4, 5, 7–9, 11)
 Matthew Sullivan – engineering assistance (1, 4, 5, 10)

Volume 2
Musicians

 John Legend – vocals (all tracks), piano (3)
 David Bowden – string arrangement (1, 12); additional vocals, bass guitar, drums, guitar (1); keyboards (12)
 Dante Bowden – keyboards, programming, string arrangement (1, 12); bass guitar, guitar (1), 
 Cremaine Booker – cello (1, 12)
 Nicole Neely – string arrangement (1, 12)
 Josée Weingand – viola (1, 12)
 Alicia Enstrom – violin (1, 12)
 Chauntee Ross – violin (1, 12)
 Paul Nelson – cello (2, 11)
 Erick Walls – electric guitar (2, 10)
 Michael Pollack – keyboards (2, 11)
 John Ryan – programming (2)
 Brandon Michael Collins – string arrangement (2)
 Monisa Angell – viola (2, 11)
 David Angell – violin (2, 11)
 David Davidson – violin (2, 11)
 Riley McDonough – background vocals (3)
 Scott Mayo – baritone saxophone (3), tenor saxophone (3)
 Bosco Mann – bass guitar (3)
 Hakeem Holloway – bass guitar (3, 9)
 AJ Fanning – cello (3, 7, 9)
 Adrienne Woods – cello (3, 7, 9)
 Caleb Jones – cello (3, 7, 9)
 Julie Jung Yoo – cello (3, 7, 9)
 Michelle E. Rearick – cello (3, 7, 9)
 Ro Rowan – cello (3, 7, 9)
 Homer Steinweiss – drums (3, 10)
 Connor McDonough – guitar (3), programming (3)
 Andrew Kingslow – Hammond B3 (3), piano (3, 10), tambourine (3)
 Ryan Daly – keyboards (3), programming (3)
 Lemar Guillary – trombone (3)
 Brandyn Phillips – trumpet (3)
 Drew Forde – viola (3, 7, 9)
 Karoline Menezes – viola (3, 7, 9)
 Richard Adkins – viola (3, 7, 9)
 Rita Andrade – viola (3, 7, 9)
 Stefan Smith – viola (3, 7, 9)
 Wilfred Farquharson – viola (3, 7, 9)
 Chris Woods – violin (3, 7, 9)
 Hannah White – violin (3, 7, 9)
 Jake Falby – violin (3, 7, 9)
 Jennifer Floyd – violin (3, 7, 9)
 Kayvon Sesar – violin (3, 7, 9)
 Lesa Terry – violin (3, 7, 9)
 Maxwell Karmazyn – violin (3, 7, 9)
 Nadira Scruggs – violin (3, 7, 9)
 Paul Cartwright – violin (3, 7, 9)
 Shigeru Logan – violin (3, 7, 9)
 Stephanie Matthews – violin (3, 7, 9)
 Stephanie Yu – violin (3, 7, 9)
 Susan Chatman – violin (3, 7, 9)
 Lindgren – additional vocals (4, 5); programming (4); bass guitar, drum programming, guitar, keyboards (5)
 Mr. Franks – bass guitar, drum programming, keyboards, percussion (4)
 Ryan Tedder – guitar (4)
 Melanie Fontana – additional vocals (5)
 Natalie Imani – background vocals (5–7, 9)
 Karyn Porter – background vocals (5, 9)
 Ian Hendrick-Smith – baritone saxophone (5, 6, 10)
 Di Genius –bass guitar (5, 6), drum programming (5), guitar (5, 6), keyboards (5, 6), additional vocals (6), drums (6), programming (6)
 Neal Sugarman – tenor saxophone (5, 6, 10)
 Dave Guy – trumpet (5, 6, 10)
 Ayana George – background vocals (6, 7)
 SheNice Johnson – background vocals (6, 7)
 Murda Beatz – drums (7), synthesizer programming (7)
 Munyungo Jackson – percussion (7)
 Mr Hudson – piano (7)
 Matthew Jones – string arrangement (7, 9)
 Gregg Wattenberg – bass guitar, guitar, string arrangement (8)
 Dave Eggar – cello, orchestra leader (8)
 Sterling Campbell – drums (8)
 Mia Wattenberg – piano (8)
 Chuck Palmer – string arrangement (8)
 Jessica Ryou – violin (8)
 Grant Pittman – Hammond B3 (9, 11)
 Roy Cotton II – Hammond B3 (9, 11)
 Johnnie Newman – piano (9)
 Justin Raisen – synthesizer programming (9)
 Gian Stone – bass guitar (11)
 Harper James – guitar (11)

Technical

 Dave Kutch – mastering
 Serban Ghenea – mixing
 Tim McClain – engineering
 Samantha Rosen – engineering (1, 2)
 Joshua Keith – engineering (1, 12)
 Doug Sarrett – engineering (2, 11)
 Patrick Curry – engineering (3, 7, 9)
 Rich Rich – engineering (3, 4, 10)
 Andrew Keller – engineering (4)
 Neal Shaw – engineering (5, 6, 10)
 Di Genius – engineering (6)
 Cole Lumpkin – engineering (8)
 Matt Smile – engineering (8)
 Justin Raisen – engineering (9)
 Bryce Bordone – mix engineering
 Kevin Peterson – mastering assistance
 Alisse Laymac – engineering assistance (2, 3, 5, 7, 8, 10)
 Peter Hanaman – engineering assistance (2, 3, 5, 7, 8, 10)
 Jeff Gunnel – engineering assistance (2)
 Matthew Sllivan – engineering assistance (3, 5, 6, 10)
 Ainjel Emme – additional engineering (9)
 Anthony Paul Lopez – additional engineering (9)

Charts

Release history

References

2022 albums
John Legend albums
Republic Records albums